FLEETCOR Technologies, Inc. is an American company that provides fuel cards and workforce payment products and services. Their customers include businesses, commercial fleets, oil companies, petroleum marketers and government in America, Netherlands, Belgium, Germany, Slovakia and various countries. The company provides services through two segments: North American and International segments. FLEETCOR's predecessor company was founded in the United States in 1986.

In March 2020, Fleetcor was named one of the 2020 Top 40 Innovative Tech Companies in Georgia by The Technology Association of Georgia.

History

2000–2005
In 2000, Ron Clarke joined the company as CEO when the company's estimated annual revenues were $25 million.

In 2002, Boston-based venture capitalist Summit Partners invested $45 million in FleetCor to expand and “[recruit] major regional and national convenience stores into the fleet program.”

In 2003, Fleetcor merged with Commercial Fueling Network (CFN) to create “the industry’s leading fleet card processing business, focused on serving the needs of petroleum marketers and business fleet operators.” The following year, FleetCor acquired Mannatec Inc. In March. In 2004, the company partnered with Citgo “to process Citgo Petroleum Corp.’s commercial fleet card, the CITGOFleet card.” In 2005, Fleetcor began a relationship with BP, a contract that has since been extended several times.

2006–2009
Bain Capital invested $75 million in Fleetcor in 2006, thus giving the company the capital to expand its presence across Europe. Fleetcor acquired United Kingdom company KeyFuels in 2006, processing over 500,000 business fleets. Other European acquisitions from 2006 to 2009 included Abbey Fuelcards, CSS, ICP Smart Concepts, Petrol Plus Region (the largest independent fuel card company in Russia), and The Fuelcard Company (a United Kingdom commercial fuel card reseller).

Along with its European expansion, Fleetcor continued to grow its US presence. In 2007, Fleetcor won a long-term card processing contract by Chevron USA but lost the contract to WEX in 2016. With the addition of an investment of $46 million in equity from Advent in 2006 for European expansion, Fleetcor launched British Petroleum (BP) Mastercard, a North American major oil co-branded fleet card, and introduced FleetCardsUsa.com, a fleet card web portal.

In 2009, Fleetcor acquired Corporate Lodging Consultants, a provider of workforce travel savings and solutions for companies. Fleetcor launched Global FleetNet, a global card processing platform, and purchased Retail Decisions’ United Kingdom fleet card operations.

2010–2013 
In 2010, Fleetcor went public, debuting a $335 million initial public offering. That year, it renewed the British Petroleum (BP) United States fleet card contract and acquired Carnet, a Czech Republic provider of telematics solutions.

Fleetcor won the $300 million Shell Europe/Asia fleet card processing contract (with Logical) in 2011 and acquired Mexico’s Efectivale (a fuel and food payments services company) and acquired AllStar Business Solutions (fuel card provider in the UK market) for $304 million.

Fleetcor continued its global expansion in 2012 by acquiring a leading fuel card systems company in Russia and CTF, a fuel payment processing services provider in Brazil, for $180 million.

2013–2022 
In 2013, Fleetcor acquired the following: Australia’s FleetCard, New Zealand’s Cardlink, VB Servicos (a provider of transportation cards and vouchers in Brazil), DB Trans (also in Brazil), Epyx (a SaaS system and a network of vehicle repair garages serving fleet operators in the UK), and NexTraq, a US-based provider of telematics solutions. Fleetcor also signed three deals in 2013, with GE Custom Fleet in Australia, Good Card, a leading Brazilian fuel card network operator, and Husky Oil Limited.

In 2014, the company established minority investment in Masternaut, a European-based provider of telematics solutions, signed definitive documents to acquire Shell's SME portfolio in select European markets, and acquired Pacific Pride (a cardlock fueling network operating in the US and Canada) and Comdata (a business-to-business provider of innovative electronic payment solutions) for $3.45 billion.

BP awarded Fleetcor a long-term contract in 2015.

Fleetcor acquired Travelcard (universal fuel card issuer in the Netherlands) and Sem Parar (electronic toll payments company in Brazil) in 2016, and Fleetcor signed an agreement to manage the commercial fuel card program for Speedway LLC (Speedway) the same year.

Fleetcor joined the Fortune 1000 in 2017, and expanded to Italy with minority investment in Qui! Group, an Italian-based provider of food voucher and card solutions. Cambridge Global Payments, a B2B international payments provider, and Creative Lodging Solutions, a leading lodging provider to businesses, were added to Fleetcor's acquisitions as well.

Named by Forbes as a Global 2000 Growth Champion and one of the World's Most Innovative Companies, Fleetcor joined the S&P 500 in 2018. Fleetcor made a minority investment in P97 Networks, Inc., a cloud-based mobile commerce solutions company, the same year.

In 2019, Fleetcor led three major acquisitions: Nvoicepay (an Account Payables automation for businesses company), Sole Financial (a payroll card provider), and Travelliance (airline lodging programs).

In November 2019, Fleetcor officially opened a new corporate office in the Terminus 100 office.

Fleetcor appointed a new chief financial officer, Charles Freund, in August 2020; Freund succeeded Eric Dey, who held the position for 18 years and remained at the company as a senior advisor until 2021.

In August 2022, Fleetcor acquired Accrualify, an accounts payable software firm.

International activity 
Fleetcor Europe Limited operates as a subsidiary of Fleetcor Technologies, Inc.

Senior management 
 CEO: Ron Clarke (August 2000 – present) 
 Interim CFO: Alissa Vickery (2022 – present)
 CMO: Dan Csont (September 2020 – present)
 CIO: Scott duFour (February 2019 – present)
 EVP, Corporate Development & Strategy: Steve Greene (December 2019 – present)
 CHRO: Crystal Williams (2017 – present)
 Group President – Corpay Payables: Rick Fletcher (March 2022 – present)
 Group President – Corpay Cross-Border Solutions: Mark Frey (March 2022 – present)
 Group President – Global Fleet: Alan King (May 2022 – present)
 Group President – Brazil: Armando Netto (2014 – present)
 Group President – Lodging: Ron Rogers (May 2016 – present)
 Group President – Prepaid: Mark Schatz (May 2020 – present)

Controversy
During the 2022 Russian invasion of Ukraine, Fleetcor refused to join the international community and withdraw from the Russian market. Research from Yale University updated on April 28, 2022 identifying how companies were reacting to Russia's invasion identified Fleetcor in the worst category of "Digging In", meaning Defying Demands for Exit: companies defying demands for exit/reduction of activities.

References

External links

Companies listed on the New York Stock Exchange
Companies based in Gwinnett County, Georgia
Financial services companies established in 2000
2010 initial public offerings
Financial technology companies